The contestants in the Irish National Final were decided by two semi-finals, where three were chosen from the first which was held on 6 February with the second being held on 20 February. The Final was held on 3 March 1968 and was broadcast on RTÉ TV in Dublin, Ireland. All three shows were hosted by Brendan O'Reilly.

Before Eurovision

National final

First semi-final
The first Semi-final was held on 6 February.

Second semi-final
The second Semi-final took place on 20 February.

Final
The Irish National Final was held on 3 March.

At Eurovision
Ireland started at number 14 in the startfield and finished 4th with 18 points.

Voting

References

External links
 Eurovision Song Contest : National Final : Ireland 1968
 Irish National Final 1968 - Geocities.com
 Irish National Semi-Finals 1968 - Geocities.com

1968
Countries in the Eurovision Song Contest 1968
Eurovision
Eurovision